The Berlin ExpoCenter Airport (short BECA) is a multi-purpose exhibition center on the perimeter of Berlin Brandenburg Airport. The ExpoCenter is built to host aviation related fairs, like the ILA Berlin Air Show.

Planning 

The construction work for the area started in August 2011 and was finished around April 2012.

The main section of the grounds covers approximately 250,000 square metres (62 acres). It includes halls and chalet areas for aircraft displays and an outdoor display area for spectators and access routes.

The operating company Messeimmobilien Selchow GmbH (MIS) invested 27 million Euro in the development of the new grounds.

Exhibitions

2012 
 04. to 06. June: Panorama (Berlin Fashion Week) 
 11. to 16. September: ILA Berlin Air Show

External links 

 Official ILA-Page

References 

Trade fairs in Germany
Convention centres in Germany
Economy of Berlin
Air shows
Buildings and structures in Dahme-Spreewald